The Mathias C. and Eva B. Crowell Fuhrman Farm is an agricultural historic district located north of Independence, Iowa, United States.  At the time of its nomination it consisted of seven resources, which included three contributing buildings, two contributing sites, one non-contributing building, and one non-contributing structure.  The significance of the district is attributed to its being a collection of farm related buildings that exemplify the changes in farming in the local area.  The contributing buildings include the 1906 Queen Anne house, the 1901 frame barn with a gambrel roof, the 1920s corncrib, and the ruins of the 1920s hog house and a stable (1865).  The stable is believed to date from the original development of the farmstead.  The metal machine shed and a silo are the non-contributing elements.  Three generations of the Fuhrman family operated the farm until it was sold to Tom and Beth Greenley.  The district was listed on the National Register of Historic Places in 1998.

References

Queen Anne architecture in Iowa
Buildings and structures in Buchanan County, Iowa
National Register of Historic Places in Buchanan County, Iowa
Historic districts on the National Register of Historic Places in Iowa
Farms on the National Register of Historic Places in Iowa